Georgi Eduardovich Conus,  (Georgy Eduardovich Konyus; , Moscow  29 August 1933, Moscow) was a Russian music theorist and composer of French descent.

He was the eldest of the three Conus brothers, of whom the others were Julius and Lev.

He is buried in Novodevichy Cemetery, Moscow.

He had a marked influence upon such students as Alexander Scriabin and Reinhold Glière. For a time, much was expected of Georgi as a composer. Tchaikovsky thought so highly of his promise that he obtained for him the Tsar's annual stipend of 1200 rubles awarded to deserving musicians. Georgi did indeed compose songs, a ballet, a cantata, two symphonic poems, and a variety of other instrumental works. None of these have entered the international repertoire, and Georgi ultimately became more and more immersed in musical academics, formulating an abstruse system he called "metro-techtonic analysis" for the scientific measurement of symmetry in musical forms.

External links

Notes and references 

1862 births
1933 deaths
19th-century musicians from the Russian Empire
20th-century Russian musicians
19th-century classical composers
20th-century classical composers
Pupils of Sergei Taneyev
Russian Romantic composers
Russian male classical composers
Russian music educators
Russian people of French descent
Musicians from Moscow
Composers from the Russian Empire
20th-century Russian male musicians
19th-century male musicians
19th-century musicians